The Temptress (Italian: Le Due verità) is a 1951 French-Italian melodrama film directed by Antonio Leonviola and starring Anna Maria Ferrero, Michel Auclair and Michel Simon.

The film's sets were designed by Luigi Scaccianoce.

Cast
 Anna Maria Ferrero as Maria-Luce Carlinet  
 Michel Auclair as Lut Loris  
 Michel Simon as Cidoni  
 Valentine Tessier as Madame Muk  
 Ruggero Ruggeri as Presidente tribunale  
 Giulio Stival as Procuratore generale  
 Mario Pisu 
 Lucia Bosé 
 Flora Torrigiani
 Enzo Furlai  
 Gino Rossi 
 Lilly Drago
 Clara Ferrero 
 Carla Arrigoni
 Vittorio Manfrino

References

Sources
 Bayman, Louis. The Operatic and the Everyday in Postwar Italian Film Melodrama. Edinburgh University Press, 2014.

External links
 

1951 films
1951 drama films
Italian drama films
French drama films
1950s Italian-language films
Films directed by Antonio Leonviola
French black-and-white films
Italian black-and-white films
Melodrama films
1950s Italian films
1950s French films
Italian-language French films